Henricus melanoleuca is a species of moth of the family Tortricidae. It is found in Mexico (Puebla, Tamaulipas) and Ecuador (Carchi Province).

References

Moths described in 1968
Henricus (moth)